Janet Gould Carr (1927–2020) was an English psychologist who ran a fifty-year study on families with children with Down syndrome.

References

1927 births
2020 deaths
British women psychologists